Cecil Herbert Marriott Watson  (23 October 1878 – 5 March 1961) was  a former Australian rules footballer who played with Melbourne in the Victorian Football League (VFL).

Notes

External links 
		

1878 births
1961 deaths
Australian rules footballers from Victoria (Australia)
Melbourne Football Club players